Iran competed at the 2022 Winter Paralympics in Beijing, China which took place between 4–13 March 2022.

Elaheh Gholi Fallah was the flag bearer for Iran during the opening ceremony.

Competitors
The following is the list of number of competitors participating at the Games per sport/discipline.

Cross-country skiing

Iran competed in cross-country skiing.

Snowboarding

Iran competed in snowboarding.

See also
Iran at the Paralympics
Iran at the 2022 Winter Olympics

References

Nations at the 2022 Winter Paralympics
2022
Winter Paralympics